It was on Yesterday is a 2017 Burmese action-crime television series. It aired on MRTV-4, from January 2 to January 29, 2017, on Mondays to Fridays at 19:00 for 20 episodes.

Cast
 Thu Riya as Oakkar
 A Linn Yaung as Tain Saing
 Phone Shein Khant as Min Myat
 Aye Myat Thu as Khat Khat Khaing
 Yoon Yoon as Pan Yaung
 Thiri Soe Moe as Khin Pont
 Kaung Set Naing as Kyaw Htin

See also
It was on Yesterday 2

References

Burmese television series
MRTV (TV network) original programming